

Straus Park is a small landscaped park on the Upper West Side of Manhattan, at the intersection of Broadway, West End Avenue,  and 106th Street.

The model for the statue was Audrey Munson. On the memorial is carved a passage from Second Samuel 1:23, "Lovely and pleasant were they in their lives and in their death they were not parted." The passage refers to Ida's choice to stay with her beloved husband, Isidor, rather than get safely into a lifeboat.

The Strauses lived in a house at 2747 Broadway, between 105th and 106th Streets, one block south of the location of the memorial.

The park exists on a small triangle of land at the intersection of Broadway and West End Avenue. It was known as Schuyler Square when acquired by the city in 1895 and was renamed Bloomingdale Square in 1907. Between 1995 and 1997, Straus Park was renovated and expanded to the west, by the addition of 15 feet of West End Avenue.  An endowment established by the Straus family funded the transformation of a neglected reflecting pool in front of the sculpture into a planting bed.  The Friends of Straus Park fund maintenance and the planting of seasonal flowers.

In popular culture
 Straus Park is mentioned in Andre Aciman's novel Eight White Nights (2011).
 Straus Park is the title of a novel by Belgian author Paul Baeten Gronda, published in 2013.

See also
 Titanic Memorial, six miles away

References

External links

 Audrey Munson website photos
 Friends of Straus Park Newsletter
 An illustrated excerpt of André Aciman’s essay Shadow Cities, about Straus Park

Parks in Manhattan
Pocket parks
West End Avenue
Upper West Side
RMS Titanic memorials